Todd Woodbridge and Mark Woodforde were the defending champions but were eliminated in the round robin.

Jacco Eltingh and Paul Haarhuis defeated Richard Krajicek and Mark Petchey in the final, 4−6, 6−3, [10−6] to win the senior gentlemen's invitation doubles tennis title at the 2017 Wimbledon Championships.

Draw

Final

Group A
Standings are determined by: 1. number of wins; 2. number of matches; 3. in two-players-ties, head-to-head records; 4. in three-players-ties, percentage of sets won, or of games won; 5. steering-committee decision.

Group B
Standings are determined by: 1. number of wins; 2. number of matches; 3. in two-players-ties, head-to-head records; 4. in three-players-ties, percentage of sets won, or of games won; 5. steering-committee decision.

References
Senior Gentlemen's Invitation Doubles

Men's Senior Invitation Doubles